The Research and Documentation Center Sarajevo (RDC), was an institution based in Sarajevo, Bosnia and Herzegovina, partly funded by the Norwegian government that aimed to gather facts, documents, and data on genocide, war crimes, and human rights violations in Bosnia and Herzegovina. It described itself as an independent, non-governmental, non-profit, professional and nonpartisan institution. RDC investigated issues regardless of the ethnic, political, religious, social, or racial affiliation of the victims.

The Center was made up of independent members, intellectuals and professionals from different academic disciplines. All of RDC's documents (witness statements, photo and video material, etc.) have been made available to the International Criminal Tribunal for the former Yugoslavia (ICTY) in The Hague, as well as to the Bosnian courts, non-governmental organizations (NGOs), scientific institutions and the media.

The Bosnian Book of Dead 
In January 2013, the RDC published its final research on Bosnia-Herzegovina's war casualties, titled The Bosnian Book of the Dead. This database includes 97,207 confirmed names of Bosnia and Herzegovina's citizens, killed during the 1992–1995 war, with an additional 5,100 unconfirmed names.
An international team of experts evaluated the findings before they were released. The head of the ICTY Demographic Unit, Ewa Tabeu, called it "the largest existing database on Bosnian war victims".

Of the 97,207 casualties documented by 2013:
 60% were soldiers, 40% civilians
 90% were male
 62% were Bosniaks, 25% Bosnian Serbs, and just over 8% Croats
 Of civilian victims, 82% were Bosniaks, 10% Bosnian Serbs, and 6.5% Bosnian Croats, with a small number of Jews, Roma and others.
The percentage of civilian victims would probably have been higher had survivors not reported their loved-ones as "soldiers" to access social services and other post-mortem benefits.

Atlas of Bosnian War Crimes
Atlas of Bosnian War Crimes is online resource developed through outsourcing data and documented evidences collected by IDC (RDC) and other sources, and using Google Earth technology, with a precise information and geo-locations of all documented war-crimes, civilian and military casualties, and destroyed and damaged properties, during the 1992-96 war in Bosnia and Herzegovina. It is available for (re)search via Internet (see url in Infobox and External links).

References

External links 
 Bosanski atlas ratnih zločina / Atlas of Bosnian War Crimes  (successor organisation and online platform)
 
article on the presentation of The Bosnian Book of the Dead in Sarajevo in January 2013

Human rights organizations based in Bosnia and Herzegovina
Bosnian genocide